Edwin Thompson Denig (March 10, 1812 – September 4, 1858) was an American fur trader and pioneer ethnographer active at Fort Union, in present-day North Dakota.

Fur trader
Denig was the son of a prosperous county doctor, yet he chose to dedicate his adult life to the fur trade. In 1833 he entered into the service of the American Fur Company  as a clerk, first at Fort Pierre, and from 1837 at Fort Union. There he rose from bookkeeper to chief clerk, and finally Bourgeois (superintendent of the post and profit-sharing partner). At Fort Union Denig aided various visiting scholars, including John James Audubon, collected scientific specimens, and also collected diverse specimens for the Smithsonian Institution.

Ethnographer
On the initiative of Father De Smet, Denig began in 1851 to write descriptions of Plains Indian culture that later was included in De Smets writings. Denig also assembled data for Henry Schoolcraft, later included in this scholar's writings. A later report by Denig on the Assiniboine was published in 1930 as Indian Tribes of the Missouri. A later manuscript lay dormant in the archives, until it was published in 1961 as Five Indian Tribes of the Upper Missouri.

Personal life
Denig entered into several "country marriages" with Native American women. His first marriage was to Sina Wamniomi (Whirlwind Blanket), a Lakota, with whom he had a son, Robert, and a daughter, Sarah. His second marriage, in 1837, was with Hai-kees-kak-wee-yah (Deer Little Woman), an Assiniboine, with whom he had one son, Alexander, and two daughters, Ida and Adeline. The first wife stayed at Fort Pierre, but the son was with his father and the second wife at Fort Union. Denig also married the second wife's younger sister in a polygamous union, that eventually ended when the younger sister moved away. The marriage with the second wife was formalized in 1855 through a Catholic ceremony in St. Louis. In 1856 he moved with her and their three children to Selkirk Settlement, where the children were placed in Catholic schools. Denig was here active as an independent fur trader, but died of appendicitis in 1858.

References

Citations

Cited literature
 Barbour, Barton H. (2001). Fort Union and the Upper Missouri Fur Trade. Norman: University of Oklahoma Press.
 Ewers, John C. (1961). "Editor's Introduction", in: Edwin Thompson Denig, Five Indian Tribes of the Upper Missouri. Norman: University of Oklahoma Press. 
 Hewitt, J. N. B. (1930). "Biographical Sketch", in: Edwin Thompson Denig, Indian Tribes of the Upper Missouri.  Forty-sixth Annual Report of the Bureau of American Ethnology to the Secretary of the Smithsonian Institution, 1928-1929. Washington, DC: Government Printing Office.

1812 births
1858 deaths
People from Stroudsburg, Pennsylvania
American fur traders
Pre-statehood history of North Dakota
Writers from Pennsylvania
American Fur Company people
Businesspeople from Pennsylvania
19th-century American businesspeople
19th-century American male writers
19th-century American non-fiction writers
American male non-fiction writers
Deaths from appendicitis